Gurpreet Kaur Bhangu known as Gurpreet Bhangu is an Indian film and television actress who is active in Indian Punjabi and Hindi cinema. She is known for her performances in Singh vs. Kaur (2013), A Tale of Punjab (2015), Ardaas (2016), and 25 Kille (2016), Babe Bhangra Paunde Ne (2022) and she also appeared in the Bollywood film Mausam.

Filmography

Films

TV series

References 

Actresses from Punjab, India
Living people
Actresses in Punjabi cinema
1959 births